Cleotrivia is a genus of small sea snails, marine gastropod mollusks in the family Triviidae, the false cowries or trivias.

Species
Species within the genus Cleotrivia include:
 Cleotrivia andreiae Fehse & Grego, 2017
 Cleotrivia atomaria (Dall, 1902)
 Cleotrivia bobabeli Fehse, 2017
 Cleotrivia brevissima (Sowerby, 1870)
 Cleotrivia coletteae (Fehse, 1999)
 Cleotrivia corallina Cate, 1979
 Cleotrivia culmen Fehse, 2004
 Cleotrivia dissimilis Fehse, 2015
 Cleotrivia euclaensis Cate, 1979
 Cleotrivia globosa (Sowerby, 1832)
 Cleotrivia occidentalis (Schilder, 1922)
 Cleotrivia pilula (Kiener, 1843)
 Cleotrivia pisum (Gaskoin, 1846)
 Cleotrivia pygmaea (Schilder, 1931)
 Cleotrivia rustica Fehse, 2015
 Cleotrivia vitrea (Gaskoin, 1849)
Species brought into synonymy
 Cleotrivia antillarum (Schilder, 1922): synonym of Pseudopusula antillarum (Schilder, 1922)
 Cleotrivia aquatanica Cate, 1979 : synonym of Niveria nix (Schilder, 1922)
 Cleotrivia candidula (Gaskoin, 1836) : synonym of Trivia candidula (Gaskoin, 1836)
 Cleotrivia dorsennus Cate, 1979 : synonym of Dolichupis dorsennus (Cate, 1979)
 Cleotrivia leucosphaera (Schilder, 1931) : synonym of Dolichupis leucosphaera (Schilder, 1931)
 Cleotrivia meridionalis Cate, 1979 : synonym of Dolichupis meridionalis (Cate, 1979)
 Cleotrivia werneri (Fehse, 1999) alternate representation of Niveria werneri Fehse, 1999
 Cleotrivia wayiana (Cate, 1979): synonym of Decoriatrivia wayiana C. N. Cate, 1979

References

 Dautzenberg, P., 1921. Description d'une espèce nouvelle de Trivia. Journal de Conchyliologie 65: 330-331
 Fehse D. (1999) Contributions to the knowledge of the Triviidae (Mollusca: Gastropoda) III. A new species of Cleotrivia from Western Africa. Club Conchylia Informationen 31(1-2): 5-17

External links
 Iredale, T. (1930). Queensland molluscan notes, No. 2. Memoirs of the Queensland Museum. 10(1): 73-88, pl. 9

Triviidae